Flight of the Conchords was a radio series broadcast on BBC Radio 2 in 2005, starring the New Zealand musical comedy duo Flight of the Conchords. A 3-CD set containing all the episodes was released in 2006 by the BBC. Each disc consisted of 2 episodes.

At the 2006 Sony Radio Academy Awards, the series won bronze in the Comedy Award.  The later HBO television series of the same name was a spin-off from this radio series.

The series is regularly repeated on BBC Radio 4 Extra.

A Director's Cut release was planned by BBC, which was set to include "outtakes and full-length songs from the duo", and was initially set to be released on 13 November 2008 and was available for pre-order from the BBC Shop. However, the release date was then pushed back to 31 December 2009 and later 31 December 2010. The title has not been released, and the BBC Shop eventually removed their product page for the item.

Credits
 Performers: Jemaine Clement, Bret McKenzie, Rhys Darby and Neil Finn
 Presenter: Rob Brydon
 Producer: Will Saunders
 Writers: Joel Morris, Jemaine Clement, Bret McKenzie, Rhys Darby
 Music: Bret McKenzie, Jemaine Clement, Mark Allis, David Catlin-Birch, Anna-Maria La Spina
 Sound: Nigel Acheson, Clair Wordsworth, Neil Pickles, Chris Morris, Rob Capocchi
 Broadcast Assistant: Hayley Nathan

Episode listing

Episode 1 - Tower of London
Hello, I'm Rob Brydon
Think Think About It
Mikey's Flat
Flat Tour
Brian Books a Gig
Band Meeting #1
Frodo
The Tower of London
Brian and Neil #1
Is That an Arrow?

Guest Performers: Mike Sengelow, Andy Parsons
Songs: "Think About It, Think, Think About It" (aka "Junkies with Monkeys"); "Frodo, Don't Wear The Ring"

Episode 2 - Dan & the Panda
Hello, I'm Rob Brydon
Bowie
My Name's Tim
The Room Incident
Brian and Craig
Body Image
Bernard from EMI
You Got It Goin On
Brian and Neil #2
The Confession

Guest Performers: Dan Antopolski, Daniel Kitson

Episode 3 - The Fans Proposition
Hello, I'm Rob Brydon
Click on This One
Orange Dinosaur Slide
Contest Winners
Sing for Supper
Photo Book
Anything Tri
Band Meeting #2
Guys!!!
Trevor Is Angry

Guest Performers: Nina Conti, Jimmy Carr

Episode 4 - Pop Song
Hello, I'm Rob Brydon
Bret Sets Off for a Pie
Business Time
Brian Can Barely Contain Himself
In the Pie Shop Again
Nearly a Woman
The Coffee Cart
What the Fuck
Whambi Turns Up Everywhere
Nearly a Woman (At The Pig & Whistle)

Guest Performers: Whambi, Mark Goodier, Greg Proops, Emma Kennedy

Episode 5 - Suzanne
Hello, I'm Rob Brydon
Creative Juices
Waterloo Bridge
What You're Into
I'm Not Crying
After the Gig
Disharmony
Sue Is Trying to Split the Band
The Band's Broken Up
The Humans Are Dead

Guest Performers: Emma Kennedy

Episode 6 - Neil Finn Saves The Day!
Hello, I'm Rob Brydon
All in the Toilet
A Bret-Shaped Hole
Jemaine's Going to Do It
The Royal Albert Hall
The Folk Parody Duo
Community Fete Board
Sticky Situation
Work Permit Violation
What of the Legacy

Guest Performers: Justin Edwards, Jarred Christmas, Beth Chalmers, Jimmy Carr, Emma Kennedy

References

2006 albums
2005 radio programme debuts
BBC Radio 2 programmes
Radio programs adapted into television shows